During the 1940–41 season Bologna Associazione Giuoco del Calcio competed in Serie A and Coppa Italia.

Summary 
Even with the war the season started four months before, Bologna won its fourth title;  This was the last trophy for the club until the 60s: the next season Bologna grab the 7th spot and the, due to war, the tournament was in fact suspended. Also, Uruguayan striker Puricelli repeated his feat as capocannoniere with 22 goals  At the end of the tournament, Felsner returned to his country Germany in a first signal of the end of an era for the club.

Squad

Competitions

Serie A

League table

Matches

Coppa Italia

Round of 32

Eightfinals

Quarterfinals

Statistics

Squad Statistics

Players statistics 
Source:

Appearances
26.Piero Andreoli 
24.Michele Andreolo 
2.Narciso Benetti 
34.Amedeo Biavati 
11.Arturo Boniforti 
1.Tolmino Casadio 
4.Giordano Corsi 
20.Giovanni Ferrari 
29.Pietro Ferrari 
15.Dino Fiorini
1.Antonio Innocenti 
14.Bruno Maini 
27.Aurelio Marchese 
8.Mario Montesanto 
32.Mario Pagotto 
30.Héctor Puricelli 
31.Carlo Reguzzoni 
30.Secondo Ricci 
25.Raffaele Sansone 
5.Mario Sdraulig 
5.Glauco Vanz

Goalscorers
7.Piero Andreoli 
2.Michele Andreolo 
8.Amedeo Biavati 
2.Giovanni Ferrari 
1.Bruno Maini 
1.Aurelio Marchese 
28.Héctor Puricelli 
18.Carlo Reguzzoni 
2.Raffaele Sansone
3.Mario Sdraulig

References

Bibliography

External links 
 
 
 

Bologna F.C. 1909 seasons
Italian football championship-winning seasons
Bologna